The 1998 Torneo Godó was a men's tennis tournament played on Clay in Barcelona, Spain that was part of the ATP Championship Series of the 1998 ATP Tour. It was the 46th edition of the tournament and was held from 13 April until 19 April 1998.Unseeded Todd Martin won the singles title.

Finals

Singles

 Todd Martin defeated  Alberto Berasategui, 6–2, 1–6, 6–3, 6–2.
 It was Martin's 1st title of the year and the 6th of his career.

Doubles

 Jacco Eltingh /  Paul Haarhuis defeated  Ellis Ferreira /  Rick Leach, 7–5, 6–0.

References

External links
 ITF tournament edition details

Godo
Barcelona Open (tennis)
Godo